Iren Dimitrova (Bulgarian: Ирен Димитрова) (born 1950) is a Bulgarian piano player and tutor of piano accompaniment and chamber music.

Life
Dimitrova studied at the National Music Academy of Bulgaria in the piano class of prof. P. Pelishek, after which she specialised in chamber music and piano accompaniment at the Russian Academy of Music Gnesin, Moscow where she received her PhD. She enjoyed a long performance and teaching career, and taught chamber music and piano accompaniment in the National Art School of Varna, piano at the Varna Free University "Chernorizets Hrabar", at the University of Shumen "Constantine of Preslav" and the Higher Institute of Music of Sfax. Dimitrova is one of the first pedagogues in Bulgaria who dedicated their life to the piano accompaniment and chamber music teaching and her activity greatly contributed to the development of these disciplines in the country. In 2011 she was honoured with the Lifetime Achievement Award.

References

External links
Iren Dimitrova Official website

1950 births
Living people
Bulgarian classical pianists
Women classical pianists
Chamber music
Bulgarian music educators
21st-century classical pianists